The 1947–48 Panhellenic Championship was the 14th season of the highest football league of Greece. The clubs that participated were the champions from the 3 founding football associations of the HFF: Athens, Piraeus and Macedonia. Olympiacos won the championship in an undefeated run for a 3rd time in their history. The point system was: Win: 3 points - Draw: 2 points - Loss: 1 point.

Qualification round

Athens Football Clubs Association

Piraeus Football Clubs Association

Macedonia Football Clubs Association

Final round

League table

Top scorers

External links
Rsssf, 1947-48 championship

Panhellenic Championship seasons
Greece
Panhellenic Championship